Potamocorbula laevis is a species of marine bivalve in the family Corbulidae.

It was originally described in 1843 by Richard Brinsley Hinds (1812-1847) under the protonym of Corbula laevis from specimens collected at Hong Kong.

References 

 Lozouet, P. & Plaziat, J.-C., 2008 Mangrove environments and molluscs, Abatan river, Bohol and Panglao islands, central Philippines, p. 1-160, 38 pls
 BU. (2013). Provision of services for field sampling, species identification and data analysis of benthic faunal communities of Hong Kong marin waters. Final report submitted to EPD
 Huber, M. (2010). Compendium of bivalves. A full-color guide to 3,300 of the world's marine bivalves. A status on Bivalvia after 250 years of research. Hackenheim: ConchBooks. 901 pp., 1 CD-ROM
 Liu, J.Y. [Ruiyu] (ed.). (2008). Checklist of marine biota of China seas. China Science Press. 1267 pp.

External links
 Hinds, R. B. (1843). Descriptions of new species of shells collected during the voyage of Sir Edward Belcher, C.B., and by H. Cuming, Esq., in his late visit to the Philippine Islands. Proceedings of the Zoological Society of London. (1843) 11: 55-59

Corbulidae
Molluscs described in 1843